Zygmunt Puławski (October 24, 1901 – March 21, 1931) was a Polish aircraft designer and pilot. He invented a gull-wing aircraft design, also known as "Puławski wing" and designed a series of Polish PZL fighters.

He was born in Lublin. In the summer of 1920, during the Soviet offensive in the Polish-Soviet War, he volunteered for a Boy Scout battalion. In late 1920 he commenced studies at Warsaw University of Technology. He was a member of the Aviation Section of the Students' Mechanical Club, where he constructed some gliders. He distinguished himself as a thorough and able student. In 1925 he graduated from the University, receiving the Engineer title, and left for practice in the Breguet works in France. After his return, he served in the national service, completing military aviation school in Bydgoszcz and becoming a pilot. From 1927 he became a main designer of the Central Aviation Workshops (CWL) at Słupecka Street in Warsaw, soon reorganized into the PZL (Państwowe Zakłady Lotnicze - State Aviation Works).

To meet a requirement of the Polish military department, in 1928 Puławski designed a modern all-metal high-wing fighter with an inline engine, PZL P.1. For the P.1, he invented a gull-wing design, giving the pilot an excellent view from his cockpit.  The P.1 was flown in 1929 and met with great interest in the world. Its wing design became also known as "Puławski wing" or "Polish wing", and was later copied in some other designs in the world. The P.1 was not produced, in a favour of Puławski's next designs with a radial engine, preferred by the Polish Air Force. A development of the P/1 was the PZL P.6 with a radial engine, first flown in 1930. With a pilot Bolesław Orliński, it won a National Air Races in the USA. It was named the best fighter in the world by some of military press at that time. Its improved variant, PZL P.7, was produced for the Polish Air Force (150 made). In early 1931 Puławski designed another fighter development PZL P.8, returning to his favourite inline engine. In 1930, he was also ordered to start working upon the P.7 development, with a stronger engine and begun design work upon the PZL P.11 then.

Puławski also flew aircraft in the Warsaw Aeroclub. He died on March 21, 1931 in a crash of his newest amphibious flying boat PZL.12 in Warsaw, at the age of 29 (the plane fell due to strong wind, after take-off). After his death, the PZL P.11 project was finished by Wsiewołod Jakimiuk, becoming the main Polish fighter during the Invasion of Poland 1939. Additionally, a faster export model PZL P.24, based entirely on Puławski's construction features, was developed and sold to some countries.

Puławski was one of the most talented Polish designers. Partly due to his death, Puławski's fighters, most modern in the early 1930s, had not been replaced with modern successors before 1939, when they were already obsolete.

A list of Puławski's designs

See also

Stanisław Wigura
Jerzy Drzewiecki
Jerzy Dąbrowski
Kazimierz Pułaski (not to confuse names)

1901 births
1931 deaths
Aviators killed in aviation accidents or incidents
Polish aerospace engineers
Polish aviators
20th-century Polish inventors
Victims of aviation accidents or incidents in 1931
Victims of aviation accidents or incidents in Poland
Warsaw University of Technology alumni